Art Price is a former linebacker in the National Football League. He played with the Atlanta Falcons during the 1987 NFL season.

References

Sportspeople from Hampton, Virginia
Atlanta Falcons players
American football linebackers
Wisconsin Badgers football players
1962 births
Living people
National Football League replacement players